Fear of God refers to fear or a specific sense of respect, awe, and submission to a deity.

Fear of God may also refer to:

Music 
 Fear of God (American band), a 1990s Los Angeles metal band
 Fear of God (The Bats album) or the title song, 1991
 Fear of God (Deitiphobia album), 1991
 The Fear of God (Eshon Burgundy album) or the title song, 2015
 The Fear of God (Showbread album) or the title song, 2009

Other uses 
 Fear of God, a streetwear label founded by Jerry Lorenzo

See also 
 Fear of God II: Let Us Pray, a 2011 EP by Pusha T
 God-fearer, a class of Gentile sympathizers to Hellenistic Judaism